Erivelto Emiliano da Silva (born 1 October 1988), known as Erivelto, is a Brazilian professional footballer who lastly played as a striker.

References

External links
 
 

1988 births
Living people
Brazilian footballers
Association football forwards
Primeira Liga players
Liga Portugal 2 players
Qatar Stars League players
Campeonato Brasileiro Série B players
Guarani FC players
Mixto Esporte Clube players
Guaratinguetá Futebol players
Central Sport Club players
Madureira Esporte Clube players
S.C. Covilhã players
Mesaimeer SC players
Boavista F.C. players
Brazilian expatriate footballers
Expatriate footballers in Portugal
Expatriate footballers in Qatar
Expatriate footballers in Thailand
Brazilian expatriate sportspeople in Portugal
Brazilian expatriate sportspeople in Qatar
Brazilian expatriate sportspeople in Thailand
Batatais Futebol Clube players
Erivelto Emiliano da Silva
Erivelto Emiliano da Silva
Erivelto Emiliano da Silva
Erivelto Emiliano da Silva
Erivelto Emiliano da Silva
Nakhon Si United F.C. players